Kanh (also spelled Kahn) or Kanha is a river flowing through Indore, the largest city in the Indian state of Madhya Pradesh. The river started carrying sewage in the early 1990s. Several attempts have been made to clean the river, yet it remains polluted.

The river, along with the Saraswati River, is a part of the Smart City Indore project, and a riverfront spanning 3.9 kilometres has already been developed along the river. Both the rivers are being rejuvenated under the Smart Cities Mission.

Pollution and environmental concerns
Kanh has turned into a sewage dumpyard, where many industries have been dumping solid as well as liquid wastes into it, since the rapid industrialisation in the 70s. 

As an additional load, the household drainage is also dumped into the Kanh without any purification or cleaning.

There have been several attempts to clean the river since 1985, but none of them have materialised till date.

Rejunevation
In 2015, the Indian government announced Smart Cities Mission. Indore successfully qualified in Phase-1 of the Smart Cities Mission, it ranked eleventh on the list released by Union Minister Venkaiah Naidu (MoUD) and is one of the first twenty cities to be developed as Smart City. The Smart City Indore mission was widely appreciated for the efforts put by the government in citizen engagement. Under the mission, an amount of Rs 39 crores has been spent as of 2020 on Kanh and Saraswati riverfront development marking the completion of five out of eight stages of the riverfront's development.

In 2023 the Union government sanctioned Rs. 511.15 Crore for the cleaning of the Kanh and Saraswati rivers, under the 'Namami Gange Programme’. Constructions undertaken using these funds are expected to be completed in the next two years.

Source
The Kanh rises from the Kakri Bardi hills which is also the source of the Shipra River. 

Kanh later joins Shipra, which further joins into Chambal, then Yamuna and finally into the Ganga river.

See also
 Fair river sharing
 List of rivers by discharge
 List of rivers by length
 List of rivers of India

References

Rivers of India
Rivers of Madhya Pradesh